The Meshik River is a stream,  long, on the Alaska Peninsula in the U.S. state of Alaska. Beginning on the flanks of Mount Aniakchak in Aniakchak National Monument and Preserve, it flows generally west into Bristol Bay near the city of Port Heiden.

The Meshik is one of several peninsula rivers with many game fish but little fishing pressure because of their remote location, severe weather, and other factors. The main species on the main stem and its tributaries are Chinook, Coho, and sockeye salmon, as well as char. Access is possible by boat or floatplane.

See also
List of rivers of Alaska

References

Rivers of Lake and Peninsula Borough, Alaska
Rivers of Alaska